The 2022 season was the 20th season of competitive kickboxing in Romania.

List of events

Prometheus 2

Prometheus 2: Rusu vs. Dragomir was a kickboxing event produced by the Prometheus Fighting Promotion that took place on March 25, 2022, at the Olimpia Arena in Ploiești, Romania.

Results

UFT 9

UFT 9 was a kickboxing and mixed martial arts event produced by the Ultimate Fighting Tournament that took place on March 25, 2022, at the Horia Demian Arena in Cluj-Napoca, Romania.

Results

Colosseum Tournament 30

Colosseum Tournament 30: Căliniuc vs. Lamiri was a kickboxing event produced by the Colosseum Tournament that took place on April 8, 2022, at the Baltiska Hall in Malmö, Sweden.

Singer Oana Radu made special guest appearances at the event.

Background 
A Colosseum Tournament World Lightweight Championship bout between current champion Sorin Căliniuc and former Kunlun Fight World Lightweight Champion Dzianis Zuev was expected to headline the event. However, due to the 2022 Russian invasion of Ukraine, Zuev was removed from the card as a result of the Swedish federation banning Russian and Belarusian athletes. As a result, Zuev was replaced by Andre Mannaart's Sami Lamiri (Mejiro Gym).

A non-title welterweight bout between two-division Colosseum Tournament champion Eduard Gafencu and Joakim Hägg co-headlined the event.

A featherweight bout between DFS Lightweight Champion Adrian Maxim and Amir El-dakkak took place at the event.

Current Colosseum Tournament World Bantamweight Champion Iulian Marinescu faced Nicholas Bryant in a non-title bantamweight bout.

A lightweight bout between former KOK Lightweight Champion Vitalie Matei and Robbie Daniels was scheduled for the event.

Results

Urban Legend 12

Urban Legend 12: Crăciunică vs. Leviţchi was a kickboxing and boxing event produced by the Urban Legend that took take place on April 29, 2022, at the EGO Ballroom in Mamaia, Constanța, Romania.

Andrei Stoica made special guest appearances at the event.

Results

Dynamite Fighting Show 14

Dynamite Fighting Show 14: Bogdan vs. Badr (also known as Capital Fight 2) was a kickboxing event produced by the Dynamite Fighting Show that took place on May 6, 2022, at the Rapid Hall in Bucharest, Romania.

In May 2022, DFS also signed distribution agreement with NBC Sports, AT&T, Stadium, NSN and Ocean 7 WXVO  networks in the US.

Peter Aerts made special guest appearances at the event.

Background 
A heavyweight bout between former SUPERKOMBAT and Enfusion world champion Bogdan Stoica and Peter Aerts's Badr Ferdaous headlined the event.

A welterweight bout between former Colosseum Tournament World Light Welterweight Champion Florin Lambagiu and former WKN Intercontinental Champion Bassó Pires took place as the co-main event.

Results

Fight Zone 8

Fight Zone 8 (also known as Gladiator Night) was a kickboxing, mixed martial arts and boxing event produced by the Fight Zone that took place on May 8, 2022, at the Deva Arena in Deva, Romania.

Cătălin Moroșanu and Ionuț Iancu made special guest appearances at the event.

Results

Colosseum Tournament 31

Colosseum Tournament 31 (also known as Dey Grand Prix) was a kickboxing event produced by the Colosseum Tournament that took place on May 9, 2022, at the Victoria Arena in Arad, Romania.

Background
A non-title welterweight bout between two-division Colosseum Tournament world champion Eduard Gafencu and Robert Gontineac headlined the event.

A Colosseum Tournament World Welterweight Championship title eliminator between former welterweight title challenger Anghel Cardoş and Alexandru Amariței took place as the co-main event.

A lightweight bout between former ISKA World Middleweight Champion Gabriel Bozan and Cosmin-Mădălin Grosu took place at this event.

Results

Cezar WC 1

Cezar Women's Championship 1 was a women's kickboxing event produced by the Cezar Fight Championship that took place on May 14, 2022, at the CENT Hall in Baia Mare, Romania.

Results

Colosseum Tournament 32

Colosseum Tournament 32: Amariței vs. Ćulafić was a kickboxing event produced by the Colosseum Tournament that took place on June 3, 2022, at the Craiova Arena in Craiova, Romania.

Background
A Colosseum Tournament World Middleweight Championship bout for the vacant title between Vasile Amariței and Mihajlo Ćulafić headlined the event.

Results

KO Masters 10

KO Masters 10 was a kickboxing event produced by the KO Masters that took place on June 20, 2022 at the Berăria H in Bucharest, Romania.

Background
A heavyweight bout between Cristian Ristea and Kaan Murat İnanır headlined the event.

Results

Colosseum Tournament 33

Colosseum Tournament 33: Căliniuc vs. Bilalovski was a kickboxing event produced by the Colosseum Tournament that took place on June 23, 2022, at the Bucharest Arena in Bucharest, Romania.

Background
A Colosseum Tournament World Lightweight Championship bout between current champion Sorin Căliniuc (also the Colosseum Tournament World Super Lightweight Champion) and former Wu Lin Feng World Championship Champion Nafi Bilalovski served as the main event.

A lightweight bout between former KOK World Lightweight Champion Vitalie Matei and Darius Argyo co-headlined the event.

A welterweight bout between multiple world kempo champion Mirel Drăgan and Alin Răducu took place at the event.

A non-title bantamweight bout between current Colosseum Tournament World Bantamweight Champion Iulian Marinescu and Shady Plez took place at this event.

Results

Dynamite Fighting Show 15

Dynamite Fighting Show 15: Stoica vs. Tevette was a kickboxing event produced by the Dynamite Fighting Show that took place on June 24, 2022, at the Romeo Iamandi Arena in Buzău, Romania.

Background 
A heavyweight bout between former SUPERKOMBAT and Enfusion world champion Bogdan Stoica and Sam Tevette headlined the event.

A heavyweight bout between former DFS Heavyweight Champion Sebastian Cozmâncă and kickboxing star Freddy Kemayo co-headlined the event.

Results

Confruntarea Titanilor 24

Confruntarea Titanilor 24 (also known as Clash of the Titans 24) was a kickboxing and mixed martial arts event produced by the Respect Gym Găești that took place on July 22, 2022, at the Târgoviște Arena in Târgoviște, Romania.

Background
A heavyweight bout between Cristian Ristea and Olivier Langlois-Ross was expected to headline the event. However, Olivier Langlois-Ross was forced out of the fight due to an injury and was replaced by Florin Ivănoaie.

A super lightweight bout between Călin Petrișor and SB Gym's Čedo Pantić co-headlined the event.

Results

UFT 10

UFT 10 was a kickboxing and mixed martial arts event produced by the Ultimate Fighting Tournament that took place on August 12, 2022, at the Satu Mare Arena in Satu Mare, Romania.

Background
A UFT Heavyweight Championship bout for the vacant title between former Colosseum Tournament Heavyweight Champion Marius Munteanu and DFS 8 finalist Sebastian Lutaniuc headlined the event.

Results

Colosseum Tournament 34

Colosseum Tournament 34: Gafencu vs. Amariței was a kickboxing event produced by the Colosseum Tournament that took place on August 18, 2022, at the Dumitru Popescu-Colibași Arena in Brașov, Romania.

Five percent of event ticket revenue were donated to Brașov Children's Hospital.

Nick Negumereanu made special guest appearance at the event.

Background
A Colosseum Tournament World Welterweight Championship bout between current champion Eduard Gafencu (also Colosseum Tournament World Super Welterweight Champion) and Alexandru Amariței headlined the event.

The event featured a 4-Man Welterweight Contender Tournament to earn a title shot.

Results

Prometheus 3

Prometheus 3: Maxim vs. Filipov was a kickboxing and boxing event produced by the Prometheus Fighting Promotion that took place on September 1, 2022, at the Dej Arena in Dej, Romania.

Background
The event was headlined by a featherweight bout between former  DFS Lightweight Champion Adrian Maxim and Vladimir Filipov.

Results

Best of the Best 1

Best of the Best 1: Paraschiv vs. Sánchez was a kickboxing, mixed martial arts, grappling BJJ and boxing event produced by the Festivalul Artelor Marțiale that took place on September 10, 2022, at the Danubius Arena in Brăila, Romania.

Background
A SUPERKOMBAT World Middleweight Championship bout between current champion Amansio Paraschiv and ISKA World Light Middleweight Champion Sergio "Dinamita" Sánchez headlined the event.

A GFC Intercontinental Heavyweight Championship bout for the vacant title between former DFS Heavyweight Champion Ionuț Iancu and Cristian Ristea co-headlined the event.

Results

Colosseum Tournament 35

Colosseum Tournament 35: Căliniuc vs. Requejo was a kickboxing event produced by the Colosseum Tournament that took place on September 30, 2022, at the Târgoviște Arena in Târgoviște, Romania.

Background 
A Colosseum Tournament World Lightweight Championship bout between current champion Sorin Căliniuc (also the Colosseum Tournament World Super Lightweight Champion) and current WKN World Super Welterweight Champion Jordi Requejo headlined the event.

A Colosseum Tournament World Bantamweight Championship bout between the current champion Iulian Marinescu and Anatolii Gafin was originally expected to take place as the co-main event. However, Gafin withdrew for unknown reasons. He was replaced by Ovidiu Popadiuc.

A featherweight bout between former ISKA World Middleweight Champion Gabriel Bozan and Anass Ahmidouch was scheduled for the event. However, Ahmidouch was pulled from the event for an undisclosed reason and replaced by Eduard del Prado.	

A lightweight bout between Darius Argyo and Robert Guraliuc took place at this event.

A welterweight bout between multiple world kempo champion Mirel Drăgan and Alin Vînătoru took place at the event.

Daniel Dragomir faced Edmond Mustafa in a bantamweight bout.

Results

Dynamite Fighting Show 16

Dynamite Fighting Show 16: Lambagiu vs. Camara (also known as Heavyweight Invasion) was a kickboxing event produced by the Dynamite Fighting Show that took place on October 19, 2022 at the Iași Arena in Iași, Romania.

Background 
A welterweight bout between former Colosseum Tournament World Light Welterweight Champion Florin Lambagiu and former IKKC World Middleweight Muaythai Champion Diaguely Camara headlined the event.

A heavyweight bout between former DFS Heavyweight Champion Sebastian Cozmâncă (also the former Colosseum Tournament World Light Heavyweight Champion) and former ISKA World Cruiserweight Champion also co-headlined the event.

Results

Colosseum Tournament 36

Colosseum Tournament 35: Amariței vs. Orza was a kickboxing event produced by the Colosseum Tournament that took place on October 21, 2022, at the Elisabeta Lipă Arena in Botoșani, Romania.

Background
A Colosseum Tournament World Welterweight Championship bout between current champion Alexandru Amariței and Ștefan Orza headlined the event.

Results

Urban Legend 13

Urban Legend 13: Next Star was a kickboxing and boxing event produced by the Urban Legend that took place on November 11, 2022 at the La Scoica Land in Mamaia, Romania.

Ștefan Orza, Alex Filip and Mădălin Pîrvulescu made special guest appearances at the event.

Results

Colosseum Tournament 37

Colosseum Tournament 37: Mavrodin vs. Dragomir was a kickboxing event produced by the Colosseum Tournament that took place on November 21, 2022, at the Romeo Iamandi Arena in Buzău, Romania.

Results

Dynasty Fight Night

Dynasty Fight Night: The Return of "The Bomber" Alexandru Niță was a boxing, kickboxing and stick-fighting event produced by the Dynasty Fight League that took place on November 25, 2022, at the Apollo Sports Center in Bucharest, Romania.

Gago Drago made special guest appearances at the event.

Results

GWS 1

GWS 1: Amariței vs. Rigamonti was a kickboxing event produced by the Gladius World Series that took place on November 26, 2022, at the Sandro Pertini Sports Center in Milan, Italy.

Results

Fight Zone 9

Fight Zone 9: Lungu vs. Cubano (also known as Gladiators Night) was a kickboxing, mixed martial arts and boxing event produced by the Fight Zone that took place on December 4, 2022 at the Deva Arena in Deva, Romania.

Results

Dynamite Fighting Show 17

Dynamite Fighting Show 17: Night of Champions (also known as OSS Fighters 08) was a kickboxing event produced by the Dynamite Fighting Show in association with OSS Fighters that took place on December 8, 2022 at the Constanța Arena in Constanța, Romania.

Results

Urban Legend 14

Urban Legend 14: Fight For Andreea! was a kickboxing event produced by the Urban Legend that took place on December 27, 2022 at the La Scoica Land in Mamaia, Romania.

Results

See also
 2022 in Glory
 2022 in ONE Championship
 2022 in K-1
 2022 in Wu Lin Feng

References

External links
 Colosseumkickboxing.com
 Dynamitefighting.com
 Colosseum Tournament on Facebook
 Dynamite Fighting Show on Facebook
 Golden Fighter Championship on Facebook
 KO Masters on Facebook
 OSS Fighters on Facebook
 Prometheus Fighting Promotion on Facebook

Kickboxing
2022 in kickboxing
Kickboxing in Romania